Israel and Indonesia have no formal diplomatic ties, although they maintain quiet trade, tourism and security contacts. In 2012, Indonesia spoke of upgrading relations with Israel and opening a consulate in Ramallah, but this agreement was never implemented.

According to a 2017 BBC World Service Poll, 64% of Indonesians viewed Israel's influence negatively, compared to only 9% expressing a positive view.

History

While not openly opposed to Israel necessarily, Indonesia does not want to provoke the country's Islamist elements which held a staunch opposition against Israel. 

Indonesia's first president, Sukarno, brushed aside Israeli overtures and eventually adopted a strong pro-Arab policy as part of his anti-colonialist worldview. A notable incident was the expulsion of Israel and the Republic of China (Taiwan) from the 1962 Asian Games held in Jakarta. Because of the pressure from Arab countries and the People's Republic of China, the Indonesian government refused to issue visas for the Israeli and Taiwanese delegations, thus refused the entry of delegations from Israel.

However, with the transition to the New Order and the installation of General Suharto as president, military and intelligence ties were opened through unofficial channels, especially Iran and Turkey, in 1968. In 1971, Indonesian and Israeli military officers are believed to have started negotiations on transfer of military hardware and sharing of intelligence on global Communist terrorist groups. In November the following year, some counter-battery radars for accurate artillery fire were bought by the Indonesian military from the Israel Military Industries. In March 1974, a team of 27 officers and 90 soldiers from the Indonesian Army were sent to study a 2-month course to Israel on artillery radar and land surveillance, as well as ELINT and SIGINT from the Israeli Defence Forces. In January 1975, the Indonesian Navy and Indonesian Air Force sent a 60-man team to Israel to learn special insertion and covert operations from Shayetet 13 and the Israeli Navy. The result was the establishment of a Special Forces Training School to train small units of the Kopassus in airborne and seaborne insertion, in November 1975. In August 1976, Indonesian and Israeli Chiefs of Air Staff met during a supposedly coincidental visit to Tehran to discuss the Indonesian procurement of 35 Douglas A-4 Skyhawk fighter aircraft from Israel, which were ultimately delivered in 1981–82. Indonesia is also interested in Israeli-made drones, especially the IAI Searcher and IAI Heron drones. Four Searcher UAVs have been delivered through Philippines Kital Group, with Heron UAV still in consideration. Singaporean leased Searcher drones also assisted the Indonesian army in Operation Tinombala.

In 1993, Prime Minister of Israel Yitzhak Rabin met Indonesian president Suharto at his private residence in Jakarta. This, what press said was Rabin's unscheduled visit, happened during Suharto's chairmanship of the Non-Aligned Movement and shortly after the Oslo Accords. This was the first ever high-profile meeting between both leaders.

In 1999, after entering the Reformation era, Indonesian president Abdurrahman Wahid and Foreign Minister Alwi Shihab mentioned their wishes to open ties with Israel although only at the level of economic and trade links. Wahid believed that Indonesia has no reason to be against Israel. He pointed to the fact that Indonesia has "long-term relationships" with China and the Soviet Union, two countries he viewed as having atheism as part of their constitutions, and further explained that Israel "has a reputation as a nation with a high regard for God and religion." However, after Wahid's removal from office in 2001, no effort was maintained to improve the relations between Indonesia and Israel.

In 2005, Indonesia said that establishing full diplomatic ties with Israel will only be possible after peace has been reached between Israel and Palestine. Israeli Foreign Minister Silvan Shalom held a discreet first meeting with his Indonesian counterpart Hassan Wirajuda during a UN summit in New York City in September 2005. However, President of Indonesia Susilo Bambang Yudhoyono ruled out establishing formal diplomatic ties but said: "Any communication between Indonesian and Israeli officials will be oriented to the objective of assisting the Palestinian people in gaining their independence".

In 2006, Indonesia and several Islamic groups in the country condemned Israel's ongoing military operation in Gaza and demanded the release of arrested Palestinian officials, and also called on Israel to withdraw its forces from Lebanon during the 2006 Lebanon War. The Indonesian Foreign Ministry advised that the national tennis team was pulling out of its Fed Cup matches in Israel, saying "We are witnessing a military invasion by Israel and the arrest of scores of Palestinian officials...It is now impossible to play there".

In a visit to Singapore in 2006, the Israeli Arab diplomat Ali Yahya called for direct ties between Israel and Indonesia. In an interview with The Jakarta Post he said, I misunderstand why the relationship between the majorities of Muslims in Asia is hostile to Israel. If it is because of Israel and Palestine, then (how can it be reconciled that) we have peace with Jordan, Egypt, Morocco, but not with eastern Asia?

We protect the holy places in Israel, respect the Arabic language, and bring imams and rabbis together to have discussions. I am posing a question if the Muslim countries in Asia can open the gate to their country for us, so that we can open up relations with them.

There are so many opportunities in Israel and by stressing the need for cooperation we would like to get these countries to also have a share of these opportunities. But to do that, we need to have the opportunity to talk directly to these countries, which I hope, will come up soon. 

In 2008, the Jakarta Post printed a letter from Israeli Deputy Minister of Foreign Affairs, Majalli Wahabi, urging Indonesia to take a role in advocating for peace in the Middle East. Analysts suggested that the printing of the letter might be a signal of a thaw between the two nations. However, the Gaza War that lasted from late 27 December 2008 to 18 January 2009 affected relations. Indonesia harshly condemned Israeli actions, labeling it as "aggression", and expressed its support of the Palestinians.

In March 2016, Israeli Prime Minister Benjamin Netanyahu called for normalization of ties with Indonesia, citing "many opportunities for bilateral cooperation" and adding that reasons preventing relationship between the two countries were no longer relevant. However, Indonesia refused, stating that it will only consider normalization if Palestinian independence is fulfilled.

In 2018, member of Presidential Advisory Council Yahya Cholil Staquf visited Israel to meet Benjamin Netanyahu and joined a Jewish Forum, which was responded negatively by the Indonesian public.

In 2023 Israeli Olympic shooter Sergy Rikhter withdrew from international competition in Jakarta after the International Shooting Sport Federation (ISSF) refused to allow him to compete with any symbols representing Rikhter's home country of Israel. In order to qualify for the 2024 Olympic Games in Paris, athletes are required to have participated in at least two ISSF Championships during the Qualifying period, reach a Minimum Qualifying Score (MQS), and secure a place in one of five quotas within a series of four World Cup meets,
of which Jakarta is the first in this cycle. Richter won gold for Shooting at the 2019 European Games in 10 metre air rifle and competed in Tokyo Shooting at the 2020 Summer Olympics – Men's 10 metre air rifle. Reportedly, World Cup organizers informed Richter and the Israeli federation they would only allow him to participate with his weapon if he competes with identification symbols of the ISSF or the flag of the International Olympic Committee. Richter rebuffed the ISSF and chose not to compete in the World Cup, in part stating, 

I will never accept to participate in a competition without the [IOC Country Code] ISR on my competition suit, on my personal rifle and on the results screen…I start the most important year on the way to Paris, when my opponents take a professional advantage over me due to political problems. If the Olympic movement, which advocates the existence of sports without distinctions of nationality, religion, race and sex, does not support its ideology, then what is its value? I don't understand how the state is allowed to organize some sort of competition with a national identity restriction.

Agreements
In 2008, Indonesia signed a medical cooperation agreement with Israel's national emergency medical service worth US$200,000.

In 2012, Indonesia agreed to informally upgrade its relations with Israel and to open a consulate in Ramallah, headed by a diplomat with the rank of ambassador, who also would have unofficially served as his country's ambassador for contacts with Israel. The move, which had been agreed upon after five years of sensitive deliberations, would have represented a de facto upgrading of relations between the two countries. Indonesia had formally presented the move to open a West Bank consulate as a demonstration of its support for Palestinian independence. In fact, while the ambassador-ranked diplomat was supposed to be accredited to the Palestinian Authority/PLO, a significant portion of his work would have been in dealings with Israel, and the office would have fulfilled substantial diplomatic duties as well as consular responsibilities. After Israel denied the Indonesian foreign minister entry to Ramallah in 2012, Indonesia backed out from the agreement and the consulate in Ramallah was not opened. Despite the absence of formal diplomatic relations, Israel and Indonesia quietly maintain trade, security and other relations which, however have been quietly deteriorating ever since the Middle East Peace Process has been stalled.

Tourism and travel

Israeli citizens are eligible for  visas to Indonesia for single entry group tourist travel and single entry business travel. For Indonesians, tourist visas to Israel are only available for group travel through travel agencies. In May 2018, Indonesia barred Israeli passport holders from entering the country, which Israel reciprocated, although not for all types of visas. A month later, both countries reversed their tourism bans.

See also
 History of the Jews in Indonesia

References

Israel
Bilateral relations of Israel